Mulock Inlet is a re-entrant about 10 nautical miles (18 km) wide between Capes Teall and Lankester. The feature is occupied by lower Mulock Glacier which drains through it to the Ross Ice Shelf. Discovered by the Discovery expedition (1901–04) and named for Lieutenant George F.A. Mulock, Royal Navy, surveyor with the expedition.

Inlets of Antarctica
Hillary Coast